The Amazing Mary Jane is a 2019 comic book by Marvel Comics, starring Mary Jane Watson. It is written by Leah Williams with art by Carlos Gomez.

Editorial history
The comic book was first announced at the San Diego Comic-Con, with the writer Leah Williams and artist Carlos Gomez. The announcement included several promotional variant covers of Mary Jane alongside other superheroes. The plot of the comic book is a spin-off of plots from The Amazing Spider-Man published at the time.

Plot
Mary Jane Watson moves to Hollywood to make a film about the supervillain Mysterio. The director, unaware of Mary Jane's relation with Spider-Man, confides with her that he's actually Quentin Beck, the original Mysterio, using his illusion powers to conceal his identity. Mary Jane trusts him and proceeds with the film, despite the attempts of the Sinister Six to sabotage it.

Reception
Jesse Schedeen at IGN points that the release of a Mary Jane comic book may be justified by her roles in the film Spider-Man: Far From Home, the Spider-Man video game and the ongoing Spider-Man series by Nick Spencer, but doubted that the comic had much content in itself. He considered that the scenes about the woes of Hollywood film-making and the prominence of Mysterio came at the expense of Mary Jane, who looks like a secondary character in her own comic book. He also considers that the art may be appropriate for the superhero genre, and in fact looks similar to the Spider-Man comics of early 2000s, but it felt out of place in a comic book without actual superhero conflicts.

Collected editions

See also
 List of current Marvel Comics publications

References

External links
Marvel pages: TAMJ2019

Comics about women
Comics spin-offs
Spider-Man titles
Fiction about filmmaking